Léon Spartz (17 April 1927 – 7 August 1997) was a Luxembourgian footballer. He competed in the men's tournament at the 1952 Summer Olympics.

References

External links
 
 

1927 births
1997 deaths
Luxembourgian footballers
Luxembourg international footballers
Olympic footballers of Luxembourg
Footballers at the 1952 Summer Olympics
People from Heinerscheid
Association football defenders
FA Red Boys Differdange players